Each state of the United States has an official website with election results, both for the current election and for historical elections; they are listed here. Many counties also have their own official election results pages, which are not listed here.

It is rare for a state to have a complete run of historical election records online; many of the official documents are only available in paper format, especially for years prior to 1990. Previous studies of election results data have noted that official records at the county level have been routinely archived, forgotten, or discarded.

Official results may be in PDF, Excel, CSV, HTML, Election Markup Language, or plain text formats, and may be scans of the original paper documents. Not everything here is easily machine readable for further processing. There are a number of sources for this data where the original source documents have been keyed in and checked and turned into machine readable databases.

A second table below illustrates with some examples of formats.

Data formats 

This table shows the variety of formats encountered when looking at election data.  It aims, at the minimum, to show the easiest to process and the hardest to process examples from an election in each state.

References 

Elections in the United States